Events from the year 1897 in Spain.

Incumbents
Monarch: Alfonso XIII
Prime Minister: 
 until 8 August: Antonio Cánovas del Castillo
 8 August-4 October: Marcelo Azcárraga Palmero
 starting 4 October: Práxedes Mateo Sagasta

Events
June 12 - opening of Els Quatre Gats in Barcelona

Births
September 18 - Pablo Sorozábal
October 7 - Julio Ruiz de Alda Miqueleiz
November 4 - Cipriano Mera

Deaths
August 8 - Antonio Cánovas del Castillo

References

 
1890s in Spain
Years of the 19th century in Spain